Stefan Jaracz (24 December 1883 – 11 August 1945)  was a Polish actor and theater producer. He served as the artistic director of Ateneum Theatre in Warsaw during the interwar period (1930–32), and within a short period raised its reputation as one of the leading voices for Poland's new intelligentsia, with groundbreaking productions of  Danton's Death by Georg Büchner (1931), The Captain of Köpenick by Carl Zuckmayer (1932), as well as popular Ladies and Husars (Damy i Huzary) by Aleksander Fredro (1932) and The Open House by Michał Bałucki.

Life

Jaracz was born in Stare Żukowice near Tarnów during the Partitions of Poland. He studied law, history of art, and literature at the Jagiellonian University of Kraków, but gave up his studies to join theatre. He moved to Poznań for yet another contract, where he was drafted to the Austrian army in 1907. A year later he settled in Łódź where he performed until 1911. He moved to Warsaw in the Russian Partition and worked in Teatr Mały and Teatr Polski (1913). He was sent to Moscow by the Russians (1915). Upon his return to sovereign Poland in 1918 he embarked upon an energetic career in emerging national and experimental theatre, with guest performances in over ninety cities and towns until 1928. In 1930, he took over the Ateneum of Warsaw. He managed it until the Nazi-Soviet invasion of Poland, sharing the responsibilities with Leon Schiller in 1932–33 season.

During World War II he was arrested and imprisoned at the Auschwitz concentration camp. Jaracz was released after numerous interventions on 15 May 1941. He died in Otwock, near Warsaw in 1945 due to his ailing health. The repertory Stefan Jaracz Theatre in Łódź, Poland is named after him, and so is the Ateneum Theatre in Warsaw since 1951.

Acting Technique

Jaracz was endowed with a heavy, angular figure and a hoarse yet highly evocative voice. He earned the fame of the most perfect actor of roles of the disadvantaged and the humiliated. He approached them without sentimentality, conveying bitterness and coarseness as well as rebellion, even if they were deeply hidden. With his acting understated and free from affectation, he was able to create characters who were profoundly human, moving and simple. Jaracz was considered to bring to the theater a somewhat plebeian flavor that added verity to his roles. Sometimes he played bluntly, although over time his acting became more detached and would at times reveal a hint of mockery. Nevertheless, he was regarded as an actor who empathized with, respected and defended his protagonists, and who conveyed their suffering. He worked hard on his roles, polishing them and sometimes introducing major changes to stagings in other theaters.

Partial filmography

 Wykolejeni (1913) - Bankier
 Obrona Częstochowy (1913) - Michal Wolodyjowski
 Countess Walewska (1914) - Napoleon Bonaparte
 Cud nad Wisla (1921) - Jan Rudy
 Za winy brata (1921) - Karol Gromski
 Niewolnica milosci (1923)
 Skrzydlaty zwyciezca (1924)
 The Unspeakable (1924) - rada Wolski
 Milosc za zycie. Symfonia ludzkosci (1924)
 Iwonka (1925) - Gabriel's Friend
 Pan Tadeusz (1928) - Napoleon Bonaparte
 Przedwiosnie (1928) - Seweryn Baryka
 Ponad snieg (1929) - Joachim
 Uroda zycia (1930) - Rozlucki, Piotr's father
 Bezimienni bohaterowie (1932)
 Księżna Łowicka (1932) - Grand Duke Constantine Pawlowicz
 Biala trucizna (1932) - Jan Kanski
 Przebudzenie (1934) - Drunk
 Młody Las (1934) - Professor Kiernicki
 Milosc maturzystki (1935) - Drunk
 Pan Twardowski (1936) - Master Maciej, Alchemist
 Jego wielka milosc (1936) - Konstanty Kruczek
 Róża (1936) - Oset (final film role)

See also
Polish culture in the Interbellum
List of theatre directors.
List of Poles

External links

Profile at culture.pl

1883 births
1945 deaths
Polish male film actors
Polish male silent film actors
Polish theatre directors
Auschwitz concentration camp survivors
Burials at Powązki Cemetery
20th-century Polish male actors